David Cooper may refer to:

Sports
David Cooper (Indian cricketer) (born 1923)
Dave Cooper (rugby league) (fl. 1960s–1970s), Australian rugby league player
Davie Cooper (1956–1995), Scottish footballer
David Cooper (equestrian) (born 1970), Australian Olympic equestrian
David Cooper (New Zealand cricketer) (born 1972)
David Cooper (ice hockey) (born 1973), Canadian ice hockey player
David Cooper (basketball) (born 1976), Australian basketball player
David Cooper (baseball) (born 1987), American baseball player

Other people
David Cooper (abolitionist) (1725–1795), Quaker anti-slavery pamphleteer
David Cooper (jurist) (1821–c. 1873). American lawyer and jurist
David Cooper (psychiatrist) (1931–1986), South African anti-psychiatrist
David E. Cooper (born 1942), British philosopher
David Cooper (chaplain) (born 1944), British Army chaplain, Eton master and international shooter
David Anthony Cooper (1949–2008), English cathedral organist
David Cooper (immunologist) (1949–2018), Australian immunologist and HIV/AIDS researcher
Dave Cooper (born 1957), Canadian cartoonist, commercial illustrator and graphic designer
David J. Cooper (fl. 1970–2010s), professor of accounting
David Cooper (RAF officer) (fl. 1980s–2010s), British air marshal
David Cooper, half of the singing duo Otis & Shug

See also
David Couper Thomson (1861–1954), proprietor of D. C. Thomson & Co. Ltd